Miriam Leyderman (born 1964 in Maracaibo, Venezuela) is a pageant titleholder. She competed in the national beauty pageant Miss Venezuela 1984 and placed as 2nd runner-up, which earned her the title Miss Venezuela International and the right to represent Venezuela at the Miss International 1984 pageant. At Miss Venezuela she represented Nueva Esparta state.

The Miss International 1984 pageant was held in Yokohama, Japan, on October 30, 1984, Leyderman placed as 1st runner up. The winner was Miss Guatemala Ilma Urrutia.

References

External links
Miss Venezuela Official Website
Miss International Official Website

1964 births
Living people
People from Maracaibo
Miss Venezuela International winners
Miss International 1984 delegates